Benjamin Urrutia (born January 24, 1950) is an author and scholar. With Guy Davenport, Urrutia edited The Logia of Yeshua, which collected what Urrutia and Davenport consider to be Jesus' authentic sayings from a variety of canonical and non-canonical sources. Urrutia interprets Jesus' mission as a leadership role in the "Israelite nonviolent resistance to Roman oppression".

Biography
Urrutia was born in Guayaquil, Ecuador. He lived in Ecuador until 1968, and has since been a resident of the United States of America, except for the period from May 1974 to July 1977, when he lived in Israel. At Brigham Young University, he studied under Hugh Nibley. Learning from Nibley that the Book of Mormon names Shiblon and Shiblom may be derived from the Arabic root shibl, "lion cub," Urrutia connected this to the "Jaguar Cub" imagery of the Olmec people.

Urrutia has also elaborated on Nibley's argument that the word Makhshava, usually translated as "thought," is more correctly translated as "plan." Urrutia has made some contributions to the study of Egyptian Names in the Book of Mormon.

Over the years, Urrutia has written and published a number of articles, letters, poems and reviews on matters related to the work of J. R. R. Tolkien.

Benjamin Urrutia contributed stories to every volume of the LDSF series – anthologies of Science Fiction with LDS Themes. He edited the second and third volumes of the series.

Urrutia has been a book reviewer since 1970 and a film critic since 1981. As of 2017, he is a book reviewer and the principal film critic for The Peaceable Table. He is a strong advocate of Christian vegetarianism.

Ideas

New Testament and Talmud
Urrutia contends that Rabbi Yeshua Bar Abba was the historical Jesus of Nazareth and was the leader of the successful nonviolent Jewish resistance to Pontius Pilate's attempt to place Roman eagles – symbols of the worship of Jupiter – on Jerusalem's Temple Mount. Josephus, who relates this episode, does not say who the leader of this resistance was, but shortly afterwards states that Pilate had Jesus crucified. (Many scholars believe this passage of Josephus may have been slightly but significantly altered by later editors.)

The Gospel of the Hebrews says that the suggestion to be baptized by John came from the mother and brothers of Jesus, and Jesus himself agreed only reluctantly. Contrary to the common opinion, Benjamin Urrutia insists that this version must be the authentic one, because: 1) It is strongly supported by the Criterion of Embarrassment: Jesus changes his mind, and agrees to somebody else's idea. 2) This Gospel was produced by the community that included the Family of Jesus, and therefore is the most likely to include authentic family traditions.

A Talmudic legend has a Rabbi meeting the Messiah at the gates of Rome, where he is binding his wounds among the homeless poor. Asked when he will be coming, the Anointed One replies: "Today!" Perhaps this means: You need not expect a future coming of the Messiah. He is here today. Look for him among the homeless, the wounded, the hungry and oppressed.

In Chapter 8 of the Gospel of John, "the Jews who believed in Jesus" affirm that, being Children of Abraham, they have never been slaves. However, Jews observing the mainstream rabbinic tradition recite prayers at Passover, every Shabbath, and throughout the year, evoking the memory of their ancestors having been slaves in Egypt as told in the biblical Book of Exodus. This portion of John is likely the fictional creation of an editor who was unaware of Jewish culture and religion. (Note: John 8:33 They answered Him, “We are Abraham’s descendants and have never yet been enslaved to anyone;…” does not belong to the phrase/category of Jesus' comments to the Jews who believed. (30 As He spoke these things, many came to believe in Him. 31 So Jesus was saying to those Jews who had believed Him, “If you continue in My word, then you are truly disciples of Mine; 32 and you will know the truth, and the truth will make you free.”) Rather, "They answered him" should be read as the ongoing oppositional faction of Jewish leadership (The Jews who believed, in John 8:31, rightly follows the previous verse, whereas verse 33 continues the context of Jesus' conflict with the unbelieving Jews… (the edit of John 8 by some uninformed redaction is extremely unlikely and the effort to reconcile this is simple, parse verses 31-32 with 29, then continue 33 with the rest of the narrative of Jesus' conversation/conflict with… John 8:3 The scribes and the Pharisees brought a woman… a simpler reading and not requiring later assumptions of redaction.)

Hebrew Bible/ Old Testament
Urrutia applied the Structuralist theories of Claude Lévi-Strauss to the first chapter of the Bible in the article "The Structure of Genesis, Chapter One."

Accepting Jeff Popick's theory that the Forbidden Fruit is a symbolic reference to animal flesh, Benjamin offered an additional argument in favor of this exegesis: "Whether the serpent ... is the 'most subtle' of beasts or not, he certainly is a most carnivorous one. If Mr. Serpent taught our ancestors to eat forbidden food, he taught it by example. And nothing he eats is vegan or kosher."

Urrutia found intriguing connections between the Israelite hero Joseph and the Greek hero Theseus. These include carnivorous cattle and the number seven.

Urrutia found and pointed out some interesting similarities between Nimrod and pharaoh Amenhotep III (known as Nimmuria in the Amarna Letters).

Urrutia examined Kabbalistic and other sources and found evidence Yahweh was anciently considered the Son of El.

Urrutia pointed out parallels between the relationship of the Nuer to the Dinka with that of the Israelites to the Canaanites, and suggested a glottochronological approach.

Urrutia wrote a brief article on the Egyptian religious ritual of the Opening of the Mouth. In it, he traces common themes between the Opening of the Mouth and Psalm 51, such as opening the mouth (or of the lips, in Psalm 51), healing of broken bones, and washing the inner organs with special cleansing spices.

Urrutia pointed out that there are hints in the Bible that the Biblical authors may have known that not all the sons of Zedekiah perished in the Chaldean invasion.

Ancient languages
The name Mormon is explained by Urrutia as derived from the Egyptian words Mor ("love") and Mon ("firmly established").

In 1984, Urrutia produced the first translation ever of the 'Spangler Nodule', an iron nodule allegedly found in Ohio in 1800 with an inscription carved on it. According to Urrutia, the text says YHWWY (which, Urrutia suggests, may be a variant of the Tetragrammaton).

Contemporary issues
Urrutia was influenced by the Structuralism of Claude Lévi-Strauss, but  took exception to the French anthropologist's too-easy acceptance of anti-Mormon slanders.

In a review of a book that presents cases of children who have made substantial and even complete recovery from Autism with a dairy-free diet, Benjamin Urrutia avers that considering 1) that most humans cannot digest cow's milk, and 2) that "an ounce of prevention is worth a ton of cure," "all parents should cease and desist from feeding cow's milk to their infants and children before they develop autism (not to mention childhood-onset diabetes)."

Reception 
A reviewer in The Washington Post wrote: "In general, Davenport and scholar Benjamin Urrutia translate as plainly as possible, often giving familiar phrases a contemporary lilt: 'No one can work for two bosses...' Throughout, The Logia of Yeshua freshens familiar New Testament injunctions, encouraging us to think anew about their meanings."

Robert Jonas wrote in the Shambhala Sun: "Davenport and Urrutia must be applauded for their desire to awaken the reader by offering these new, bare translations of Jesus' sayings."

Professor Raphael Patai responded to Urrutia's ideas, and the two scholars had a lively dialogue for two issues of American Anthropologist.

Publications 
 The Logia of Yeshua: The Sayings of Jesus. Translated and edited in collaboration with Guy Davenport (1996).

See also
Baptism of Jesus
Christian vegetarianism
Jesuism
Josephus on Jesus
People with Basque ancestors
Urrutia

References

External links 
 The Peaceable Table, including a number of articles, cartoons, poems, reviews and stories by Benjamin Urrutia, plus this classic interview:
Article by Benjamin Urrutia:Interview with Master Yoda."

According to the website , there are eight people in the USA named Benjamin Urrutia. This one and seven others.
Dialogue, A Journal of Mormon Thought website
Urrutia, Benjamin, at Mormon SF Bibliography: Poetry
The Lewis Legacy, Kathryn Lindskoog, The C. S. Lewis Foundation for Truth in Publishing June 1, 1997

1950 births
People from Guayaquil
Living people
Ecuadorian film critics
American film critics
Ecuadorian Latter Day Saints
Brigham Young University alumni
Ecuadorian people of Basque descent
Ecuadorian emigrants to the United States
South American biblical scholars